Ciara Mary Grant (born 17 May 1978) is an Irish former international football midfielder from Waterford. She played club football for Arsenal L.F.C. and internationally for the Republic of Ireland women's national football team.

Club career
Grant began her career with Benfica. After a spell with St Patrick's Athletic, she joined Arsenal Ladies in August 1998. She was employed as a development officer by the English club.

In her first season Grant scored an equaliser against Everton as Arsenal won the Premier League Cup final 3–1. Arsenal also won the 1999 FA Women's Cup, but finished second to Croydon in the League. In the following campaign Arsenal and Grant retained the Premier League Cup, but lost in the FA Women's Cup semi-final and came third in the League. In 2000–01 Arsenal completed a domestic treble, with Grant providing an assist for the decisive goal in the FA Women's Cup final win over Fulham.

That achievement was eclipsed in 2007, as Arsenal added the UEFA Women's Cup to their trophy haul, completing an unprecedented quadruple. Grant remained an important part of the team, but had been converted from a midfielder to a central defender. After moving to Reading in 2014, Grant announced her retirement in April 2015.

International career
Grant has reached a century of caps for Ireland and, since 2000, has captained the national side. She made her debut as a teenager, in a 3–1 win over the Faroe Islands at Richmond Park.

She won her 100th cap in Ireland's 2–1 defeat to Scotland at Tynecastle Stadium in April 2012.

Grant announced her retirement from international football in February 2013.

Honours

 FA Women's Premier League National Division: 9
2000–01, 2001–02, 2003–04, 2004–05, 2005–06, 2006–07, 2007–08, 2008–09, 2009–10.
FA Women's Cup: 7
1998–99, 2000–01, 2003–04, 2005–06, 2006–07, 2007–08, 2008–09.
Women's League Cup: 6
1998–99, 1999–00, 2000–01, 2004–05, 2006–07, 2007–08.
UEFA Women's Cup: 1
 2007

References

1978 births
Living people
Republic of Ireland women's association footballers
Arsenal W.F.C. players
Republic of Ireland women's international footballers
FA Women's National League players
Expatriate footballers in England
Women's Super League players
FIFA Century Club
St Patrick's Athletic F.C. players
Association footballers from County Waterford
Dublin Women's Soccer League players
Women's association football midfielders
Benfica W.S.C. players